Yahia Rashwan (born 20 February 1969) is an Egyptian former taekwondo practitioner. He competed in the men's +80 kg event at the 2000 Summer Olympics.

References

External links
 

1969 births
Living people
Egyptian male taekwondo practitioners
Olympic taekwondo practitioners of Egypt
Taekwondo practitioners at the 2000 Summer Olympics
Place of birth missing (living people)
20th-century Egyptian people
21st-century Egyptian people